Johannes Cornelis (Hans) ten Berge (born 24 December 1938, in Alkmaar) is a Dutch poet, prose writer, and translator, who publishes under the name H.C. ten Berge. He has won numerous awards throughout his career, among them the 1996 Constantijn Huygens Prize. He lives in Zutphen.

References
Profile at the Digital library for Dutch literature

1938 births
Living people
Dutch male poets
Dutch translators
People from Alkmaar
Constantijn Huygens Prize winners
P. C. Hooft Award winners